Calliergonella cuspidata is a species of moss belonging to the family Pylaisiaceae. It is widely distributed around the world.

In a study of the effect of the herbicide Asulam on moss growth, Calliergonella cuspidata was shown to have intermediate sensitivity to Asulam exposure.

References

Hypnales
Plants described in 1911